Steam is a 2007 film written and directed by Kyle Schickner, produced by FenceSitter Films, and starring Ruby Dee, Ally Sheedy and Kate Siegel.

Plot
A college student, a single middle aged mother and an older widow meet in a steam room.

Elizabeth (Kate Siegel) is a college freshman, beginning to understand her lesbian identity in the shadow of her strict Catholic parents. Laurie (Ally Sheedy) is just beginning a relationship with her son's young coach while her ex-husband tries to use their son against her. An older widow, Doris (Ruby Dee), after years of loneliness, has met a new man.

The film weaves their stories together, exploring the similarities that connect three very different women.

Cast
 Kate Siegel as Elizabeth 
 Ally Sheedy as Laurie
 Ruby Dee as Doris
 Alan Ritchson as Roy
 Chelsea Handler as Jacky
 Charles Robinson as Reverend Patterson
 DeWanda Wise as Lynn
 Reshma Shetty as Niala
 Lane Davies as Frank
 Zach Mills as TJ

References

External links
 
 
 

2007 films
American LGBT-related films
Films about race and ethnicity
FenceSitter Films films
Films shot in New Jersey
2007 drama films
American drama films
LGBT-related drama films
Female bisexuality in film
Lesbian-related films
2007 LGBT-related films
2000s English-language films
2000s American films
English-language drama films